The 2007 College Nationals was the 12th Men's College Nationals. The College Nationals was a team handball tournament to determined the College National Champion from 2007 from the US.

Venues 
The championship was played at one venues in Huntsville, Alabama.

Modus 

The four teams played a round-robin.

The third and fourth played a small final.
The first and second a final.

Results 
Source:

Group stage

Championship

Small Final

Final

Final ranking 
Source:

Awards 
Source:

All-Tournament Team 
Source:

References 

USA Team Handball College Nationals by year